Park Place may refer to:

Media 
 Park Place (TV series), a 1981 CBS sitcom

Places

Canada 
 Park Place (Ontario), a shopping centre in the city of Barrie
 Park Place (Vancouver), a skyscraper
 Park Place Mall, Lethbridge, Alberta

United Arab Emirates 
 Park Place (Dubai), a  tower in the United Arab Emirates completed in 2007

United Kingdom 
 Park Place, Berkshire, a historic house
 Park Place (Croydon), a proposed shopping centre
 the former name of Castle Park House in Frodsham, Cheshire

United States 
 Park Place (Atlanta), a skyscraper
 Park Place (Tucson, Arizona), an indoor shopping mall
 Park Place, Houston, a neighborhood
 Park Place, Norfolk, Virginia, a neighborhood
 Park Place Entertainment, a casino and hotel operator which changed its name to Caesars Entertainment
 Park Place Hotel and Casino, a hotel and casino located in Atlantic City, later named Bally's Atlantic City
 Park Place, a street in Atlantic City, New Jersey, featured on Monopoly
Park Place (Pittsburgh), a neighborhood in Point Breeze, Pittsburgh, Pennsylvania
Park Place School in Pittsburgh, Pennsylvania, a building on the National Register of Historic Places

See also
 Park Place station (disambiguation)